Once to Every Woman may refer to:
 Once to Every Woman (1934 film), an American pre-Code film
 Once to Every Woman (1920 film), an American silent drama film